Therese Brisson (born October 5, 1966) is a Canadian former ice hockey player. Brisson played for the Canadian National women's ice hockey team from 1993 to 2005. Brisson was the second oldest member of Team Canada’s gold medal winning team at the 2002 Winter Olympics in Salt Lake City. She competed for Canada at the World Championships in 1994, 1997, 1999, 2000 and 2001. She earned a silver medal at the 1998 Winter Olympics in Nagano, Japan, which marked the first time that women’s hockey was played on an Olympic level.

Playing career
Brisson competed for the Ferland Quatre Glaces (first based out of Brossard, and then Repentigny) team in the League Régionale du Hockey au Féminin in the province of Québec. She studied kinesiology at Montreal’s Concordia University, was named athlete of the year in 1988 and 1989, and in 1997, she was inducted into Concordia University’s Sports Hall of Fame. In 1994, Brisson made her debut for Team Canada at the World Championships, playing alongside such stalwarts as Manon Rhéaume, Cassie Campbell, Geraldine Heaney and France St. Louis. She would be named an All-Star defencewoman at the tournament. Brisson was Team Canada’s Captain at the World Championships in 1999, 2000 and 2001. Brisson represented Team New Brunswick at the 1998 Esso women's hockey nationals. She scored one goal and an assists to defeat Team Saskatchewan and finish in fifth place.

At the 2002 Winter Olympics, Brisson led all Canadian defenders in scoring at the tournament. Brisson had two goals and three assists in helping Canada win its first gold medal in Women’s Olympic hockey.

Brisson also played several seasons for Montreal Axion, a professional women's ice hockey team in the National Women's Hockey League.

Personal
After the Olympics, she pursued a master's degree at York University in Toronto. Brisson was a former professor in kinesiology at the University of New Brunswick. As of 2010, Brisson is a marketing manager at Procter & Gamble Canada. She is also a board member of the Canadian Olympic Committee. As part of the IIHF Ambassador and Mentor Program, Brisson was a Hockey Canada athlete ambassador that travelled to Bratislava, Slovakia to participate in the July 2011 IIHF High Performance Women's Camp.

Awards and honours
1988 Concordia University Female Athlete of the Year (Sally Kemp Award)
1989 Concordia University Female Athlete of the Year (Sally Kemp Award)
Best Defender, 1998 Esso Nationals

References

1966 births
Living people
Canadian women's ice hockey defencemen
Concordia University alumni
Ice hockey people from Quebec
Ice hockey players at the 2002 Winter Olympics
Medalists at the 1998 Winter Olympics
Medalists at the 2002 Winter Olympics
Olympic gold medalists for Canada
Olympic ice hockey players of Canada
Olympic medalists in ice hockey
People from Dollard-des-Ormeaux
Ice hockey players at the 1998 Winter Olympics
Olympic silver medalists for Canada